Jaahid Ali (born 3 May 1995) is a Pakistani cricketer who plays for Karachi. He made his first-class debut on 26 October 2015 in the 2015–16 Quaid-e-Azam Trophy.

He was the leading run-scorer for Khan Research Laboratories in the 2017–18 Quaid-e-Azam Trophy, with 355 runs in eight matches. He was also the leading run-scorer for Khan Research Laboratories in the 2018–19 Quaid-e-Azam Trophy, with 484 runs in ten matches.

References

External links
 

1995 births
Living people
Pakistani cricketers
Karachi cricketers
Karachi Kings cricketers
Khan Research Laboratories cricketers
Cricketers from Karachi
Lahore Qalandars cricketers